Prosno may refer to the following places in Poland:
Prosno, Kuyavian-Pomeranian Voivodeship (north-central Poland)
Prosno, West Pomeranian Voivodeship (north-west Poland)
Prośno, Warmian-Masurian Voivodeship (north Poland)